The 1970–71 Chicago Black Hawks season was the Hawks' 45th. The Black Hawks advanced to the Stanley Cup Finals for the first time since 1965 but were defeated by the Montreal Canadiens in seven games.

Offseason
During the off-season, the NHL would expand by two teams, as the Buffalo Sabres and Vancouver Canucks joined the league, and both clubs were placed in the East Division.  The league also increased the schedule by two games, going from 76 to 78.  The Black Hawks were moved to the West Division as part of the divisional realignment, and the club decided to strip Pat Stapleton from his team captaincy, electing to not have a captain of the team.

Regular season
Chicago started the season very well, as the team had a record of 18–4–5 in their first 27 games.  The Hawks stayed hot throughout the season, and easily won the West Division with a club record 49 victories and 107 points, finishing 20 points ahead of the second place St. Louis Blues.

Offensively, the Hawks were led by Bobby Hull, who scored a team high 44 goals and 52 assists for 96 points, which placed him fifth in NHL scoring.  His brother Dennis Hull also cracked the 40 goal barrier, as he scored 40 goals and added 26 assists for 66 points.  Stan Mikita had another solid season, scoring 28 goals and 72 points.  Pit Martin and Bryan Campbell each had very good seasons, finishing with 55 and 54 points respectively.  On the blueline, Pat Stapleton led the team with 7 goals and 51 points, while Bill White chipped in with 4 goals and 25 points.  White also led the club with a +51 rating.  Keith Magnuson led the Hawks in toughness, setting a team record with 291 penalty minutes.

In goal, Tony Esposito led the club with 35 victories and a 2.27 GAA, along with six shutouts while appearing in 57 games.  Backup goaltender Gerry Desjardins was very solid, winning 12 games while having a 2.47 GAA.

Season standings

Game log

Playoffs
The Hawks opened the playoffs against the Philadelphia Flyers, who had a record of 28–33–17, earning 73 points, while placing third in the West Division.  The series opened with two games at Chicago Stadium, and the Black Hawks, who won a club record 30 games at home, continued their dominance, easily defeating the Flyers 5–2 and 6–2 to take a 2–0 series lead.  The series moved to the Philadelphia Spectrum for the next two games, however, the Hawks were too much to handle for the Flyers, as Chicago won a close third game by a 3–2 score, before sweeping Philadelphia out of the playoffs with a 6–2 win in the fourth game.

Chicago's next opponent was the New York Rangers, who had finished the season with a 49–18–11 record, earning 109 points, and a second-place finish in the East Division.  The Rangers defeated the Toronto Maple Leafs in their first playoff series.  Since the Black Hawks won their division, they were given home ice advantage in the series.  The series opened up with two games at Chicago Stadium, however, the Rangers took a 1–0 series lead, defeating the Hawks in overtime by a 2–1 score.  Chicago evened the series in the next game, shutting out New York 3–0.  The series shifted to Madison Square Garden for the next two games, and the Rangers won the third game of the series by a 4–1 score, however, Chicago fought back in the fourth game, demolishing New York 7–1 to once again even the series.  The fifth game was back in Chicago, and the Hawks took the series lead for the first time with a 3–2 overtime victory.  Back in New York for the sixth game, the Rangers would push the series to the limit, with their second overtime victory of the series, setting up a seventh and deciding game in Chicago.  The Black Hawks used their home ice advantage, and held on for a 4–2 victory, to win the series, and earn their first trip to the Stanley Cup finals for the first time since 1965.

The Black Hawks opponent was the Montreal Canadiens, who finished the season with a 42–23–13 record, earning 97 points, which was good for third place in the East.  Montreal then upset the heavily favored Boston Bruins in the first round, followed by defeating the Minnesota North Stars in the second round.  The series opened with two games at Chicago Stadium, and the Hawks took a commanding 2–0 series lead, defeating the Canadiens 2–1 and 5–3.  The series shifted to the Montreal Forum for the next two games, and the Canadiens evened the series with two home wins of their own, by scores of 4–2 and 5–2.  The fifth game returned to Chicago, and the Black Hawks stayed hot at home, shutting out Montreal 2–0 to take a 3–2 series lead.  The Hawks, looking to wrap up the series in the sixth game in Montreal, however, the Canadiens forced a seventh and deciding game, winning by a score of 4–3.  In the seventh game at Chicago Stadium, where the Hawks were 7–1 during the playoffs, the Black Hawks would have a 2–0 lead halfway through the game, but the Canadiens cut into the lead when Jacques Lemaire scored on a shot from center ice that got past Hawks goaltender Tony Esposito.  The Canadiens tied the game at two before the end of the second when Henri Richard scored, setting up an intense third period.  Richard once again scored 2:34 into the period, giving Montreal a 3–2 lead, and Canadiens goaltender Ken Dryden kept the Black Hawks off the scoreboard for the rest of the game, as Montreal would win the Stanley Cup in dramatic fashion for their third championship in four years.  The Canadiens were the second team in NHL history, the other the 1945 Toronto Maple Leafs to win a game seven on the road in the Stanley Cup final.

Chicago Black Hawks 4, Philadelphia Flyers 0

Chicago Black Hawks 4, New York Rangers 3

Montreal Canadiens 4, Chicago Black Hawks 3

Season stats

Scoring leaders

Goaltending

Playoff stats

Scoring leaders

Goaltending

Draft picks
Chicago's draft picks at the 1970 NHL Amateur Draft held at the Queen Elizabeth Hotel in Montreal, Quebec.

See also
 1970–71 NHL season

References

Sources
Hockey-Reference
Rauzulu's Street
Goalies Archive
HockeyDB
National Hockey League Guide & Record Book 2007

Chicago Blackhawks seasons
Chicago
Chicago